Sluka (Czech and Slovak feminine: Sluková) is a Czech and Slovak surname, derived from sluka meaning "woodcock", and originating either as a name for a shy, nervous person, or as an occupational name for a fowler. The name may refer to:

 Anton Sluka, Slovak athlete
 Bohdan Sluka (born 1988), Ukrainian football player
 Branislav Sluka (born 1999), Slovak football player
 Luboš Sluka (born 1928), Czech composer
 Marián Sluka (born 1979), Slovak football player
 Markéta Sluková (born 1988), Czech beach volleyball player
 Veronika Sluková (born 1998), Slovak football player
 Wilhelm J. Sluka (1861–1932), Austrian businessman

See also
 
Letov LK-2 Sluka, a Czech ultralight aircraft

References

Czech-language surnames
Slovak-language surnames